Tanya Hansen (born 11 September 1973) is a Norwegian pornographic actress. Before entering the adult industry, she worked as a stripper.

Career
Hansen moved from Jessheim when she finished high school and began performing in strip clubs in Oslo and appearing in softcore magazines; shortly thereafter, she started performing in adult movies.

She was editor of two Norwegian magazines, Cocktail and Lek. In 1999, Hansen hosted the P3 radio program Opptur. In 2005, she launched the clothing store "Paparazzi" and the online store "Fashion Diva". She also appeared on advertisements and commercials for the telecommunications company Telenor.

Awards and nominations
2001 Venus Award nominee – Best European Actress 
2003 Venus Award winner – Best Actress (Scandinavia)

References

External links
 
 
 
 

1973 births
Living people
Norwegian pornographic film actresses
People from Jessheim
Norwegian erotic dancers